Cryptodaphne rugosa is a species of sea snail, a marine gastropod mollusk in the family Raphitomidae.

Description
The length of the shell attains 12 mm.

Distribution
This marine species occurs off East Indonesia in the Banda Sea and in the Arafura Sea at depths between 230 m and 425 m.

References

 *

External links
 MNHN, Paris: holotype

rugosa
Gastropods described in 1997